Tibiao, officially the Municipality of Tibiao,  is a 4th class municipality in the province of Antique, Philippines. According to the 2020 census, it has a population of 28,703 people.

History

During the Spanish times in the Philippines, Spanish soldiers encountered a group of natives in hatay hatay, a watery and miry land. They asked the natives the name of the place, pointing to the vast expanse of land covered with tall reed grasses called tigbaw. The natives, who thought the Spaniards were pertaining to the name of the grass, answered Tigbaw. It is near the edge of the present-day Tibiao River (sa Tibí Kang subâ). Sojourners to the place would comment: Tibi haw? It is a question asking why they locate themselves at the edge of the river. The term tibí haw eventually evolved into Tibiao. Since then the place was called Tibiao. Allegedly, the Spaniards had difficulty pronouncing the word Tigbaw.

The old settlement was in present-day Balanti-an. The natives had to relocate to the said place, since it was secluded and distant from the shore, and it was secure from piratical raids which were common during those days.

Tibiao was part of Nalupa from 1596 to 1840. Nalupa, with its central government in present-day Jinalinan controlled the area of what is now Tibiao, Barbaza, and Laua-an. In early 1730, Nalupa gradually depopulated due to the Moro pirate attacks. By 1733, Culasi had direct control of Nalupa and Pandan. In 1796, Nalupa ceded from Culasi. As an arrabal, notable village chieftains were Paris, Oguid Pagsuguiron, and Nicolas Amar (1818).

In 1786, Oguid Datu Oguid landed in the shores of Calawgan Creek. He brought with him his family and settlers from an unspecified place in Borneo, presumably from a place where Kinaray-a is the lingua franca.

On August 6, 1786, Oguid and his followers settled in, what is now, Kamyabsan or a place of guavas. Kamyabsan is now part of Sawang Sitio in Malabor. The site was near the shore and accessible to pirate raids. They later transferred to Balanti-an to coexist with the natives. When Datu Oguid arrived in Balanti-an, he was confronted by the "Tumandoks" but could not understand each other. In exchange, Datu Oguid offered foods to become acquainted with them which was termed Panguyang or Padu-um.

In 1815, Oguid sent a delegation to Nalupa to petition the Governor of Antique, Rafael Andres Gomez, to make Tibiao a new town separating from Nalupa. The petition was granted.

On January 1, 1818, Tibiao became a new town with Don Nicolas Amar as Teniente Municipal. The Governor of Antique that time was Juan Ormido while the Teniente Municipal of Nalupa was a certain Vislilla. Tibiao remained as a vista of Nalupa.

In 1826, Oguid was no longer the Teniente Municipal of Tibiao but he orchestrated the affairs of the town. On May 2, 1926, he called for a meeting where it was agreed to hold a Thanksgiving and to build a church in their settlement. The church was 20x10x4 yards in dimension with thatched palm leaf roofing and walls made of wooden slabs. The Teniente Municipal of Tibiao at that time was Juan Mariano.

On November 1, 1826, Oguid and Governor Martinez planted a cross on a mountain east of the settlement; the mountain is presently called Mount Cruz to commemorate the event. A Thanksgiving mass, mass wedding, and baptism were held the next day.

On November 6, 1828, Oguid chose five men to survey the proposed new town site. The site selected was between Calaugan and Palaypay creeks. It was Juan Amar Sarcino who drafted the town plan. The development of the site immediately began. A church and a convent were constructed, wooden bridges built to span the Calaugan and Palaypay creeks, road laids, drainage canals, and a cemetery were built.  The Teniente Municipal at that time was Mariano Delos Santos while the Governor of Antique was Francisco Oreta.

The Parish of Tibiao was established by the Augustinian missionaries in 1849.

In 1851 Fr. Eulogio "Oloy" Cardones, a Filipino priest, was assigned as the parish priest of Tibiao. Fr. Cardones was the coadjutor bishop of the parish of Manduariao, Iloilo, before his assignment to Tibiao. The Arrival of Fr. Cardones was greeted with a fiesta celebration and a Panguyang. Tibiao is now an Independent Church,

In 1898, Pedro Bandoja (changed his name to Bandong) was the local revolutionary leader of the town.

In 1930, Nicolas Amarillo was re-elected Municipal President of Tibiao. He became a member of the National Association for Independence in Manila,  which was formerly called "Bag-ong Katipunan" while in Manila, he was able to ask thru Rep. Segundo Moscoso aid of 10,000php for the construction of a Gabaldon type fourteen room building of the Tibiao Central School and Anastacia Gindap Espanola donated the Present Site of the Tibiao Central School, except the frontage.

In 1935, Before the end of Nicolas Amarillo Second Term, Amarillo asked the new governor of that time also from Tibiao, Governor Alejandro Lim to help him negotiate the Bishop of Jaro to donate a church property, for the Municipal Building.

In 1935, Alejandro Tario Lim was elected as Governor of the province, and known as Justice of the Peace of Tibiao, a lawyer by profession. After his term, he served as Labor Administrator of Department of Labor and Senior Legislator in Malacañang Palace. During his time as governor, he constructed Municipal Plaza and the Municipal Building.

On April 19, 1942, Japanese burned the church, municipal building, and the bridge.

On September 3, 1942, Lt. Absalon appointed Martin Juanillo as Mayor of Tibiao.

On November 13, 1942, Jose Mendoza Sr. Was Appointed Mayor of Tibiao by Pio Dioso.

On June 16, 1943, the Japanese patrol penetrated Tibiao.

On December 11, 1944, Heriberto Bandoja was appointed as municipal mayor of Tibiao by Calixto Zaldivar.

In 1948, Diodata Tario Lim Bandoja was elected as municipal mayor of Tibiao, sister of the former governor of the province, Gov. Alejandro T. Lim Sr, Tating is only elementary graduate. All her siblings were UP College Graduates. She was made to stop her education to take care of her parents. But she knew the importance of education so she donated eight hectares land and 40,000php for a school building. It was named Tario - Lim Memorial High school now University of Antique Tario Lim Memorial Campus in honor of her parents, Vicente "Quin" Sanches Lim and Maria Amar Tario.

In 1950, nineteen Huks were sighted in Dalanas. Soldiers of the Philippines Ground Force were detailed to Tibiao to fight the Huks. The Municipal Mayor Diodata Tario Lim Bandoja appointed four members of the local police named Manuel Bankaya, Conrado Antonio, Alejandro Amar and Samson Amar. They caught the eighteen Huks whose commander was Alyas 120.

In 1956, Federico Ruiz Elected as Municipal Mayor of Tibiao. He donated six hectares land of their cane land. Through the help of Tobias Fornier and Diodata Lim Bandoja they established the Tario - Lim Memorial Antique School of Fisheries.

In 1960, Remegio Vista represented the country in Mexico Summer Olympics. His burst of speed was noticed he was dubbed as "The Fastest Man" in the first 50 meters of the sprint races.

In 1976, Mylene Miciano Crowned as  Lin-ay Kang Antique from Tibiao.

In 1981, Manuel M. Lim Jr. Elected as the youngest mayor of the Town at the age of 26. Grandson of Former Mayor Diodata Tario Lim Bandoja. During his time he was the doctor of the town. Through the help of Philippine army, Mayor Nonie killed three commanders and the members of New Peoples' Army in the mountains of Tibiao.

In 1982, Mary Jane Jereza was crowned as Lin-ay Kang Antique From Tibiao.

In 1992, Manuel B. Lim Sr. inaugurated the new municipal building constructed during the incumbency of Manuel M. Lim Jr.

In 1991, Tibiao celebrated the first Panguyang Festival, the official festival of the Municipality. Panguyang means a festive offering for a plenteous harvest, a thanksgiving or a harvest festival.

In 1997, the First Philippine International Whitewater Kayaking Cup ( Participated by 11 countries ) held in Tibiao River.

In 1997, Carol Josette Cardos crowned as Lin-ay Kang Antique From Tibiao.

In 1999, Quennie Bandoja was crowned as Lin-ay Kang Antique From Tibiao.

In 2003, Krishna Constantino was crowned as Lin-ay Kang Antique From Tibiao.

In 2011, Mary Kris Gualberto was crowned as Lin-ay Kang Antique from Tibiao.

In 2012, during the incumbency of Walden M. Lim, the Tibiao Eco Adventure Park "TEA PARK" was opened.

In December 2012, Gracechele Mae Managuit crowned as Lin-ay Kang Antique from Tibiao.

In 2012, Tibiao dubbed as Tourism Capital of Antique.

In 2013, Gil Baldevia Bandoja, grandson of former mayor Felimon Bandoja and son of former mayor Heriberto Bandoja was elected mayor; he was again re-elected in 2016, and in 2019, his third term.

Geography

According to the Philippine Statistics Authority, the municipality has a land area of  constituting  of the  total area of Antique.

Seco Island, over 21 nautical miles offshore, is a 1.5 km sandbar visited by tourists.

Climate

Barangays
Tibiao is politically subdivided into 21 barangays.

Demographics

In the 2020 census, Tibiao had a population of 28,703.

Economy

Tourism 
Tibiao is dubbed the Eco-Adventure Capital of Panay Island. It offers various adventure activities such as trekking to Bugtong Bato Fall, kayaking and river tubing in Tibiao River, and cultural immersion tour to Antique Rice Terraces. The Antique Rice Terraces is a recently rediscovered heritage attraction in the town of San Remigios. The rice terraces covers 600 hectares and it is preserved by the Iraynon Bukidnon, an indigenous group in Barangay General Fullon.

Government

Elected officials
Gil B. Bandoja - Municipal Mayor

Jimmy D. Barrientos - Municipal Vice Mayor

Sanguniang Bayan Members

• Andres Modesto

• Lucas Bandoja

• Walden Lim

• Amador Cumla

• Antonieta Kho yute

• Pelver Medina

• Fe Alvarez

• Fred Eraga

List of former chief executives

Notable personalities

 Alfredo Siojo Lim, former Senator and Former Mayor of City of Manila. He is the Son of Quintin Lim Sr.
 Remegio Vicente Vista, a Filipino Sprinter Representative his own country, Gold Medalist in Jakarta and the Tokyo Asian Games and Mexico Summer Olympics. He dubbed as The fastest man in Asia during his Time. Born in a depressed mountain Barangay of Salazar, Tibiao, Antique.

References

External links

 [ Philippine Standard Geographic Code]
 Tibiao Travel Guide

Municipalities of Antique (province)